"East of Eden" is a song recorded by American singer Zella Day for her second extended play, Zella Day (2014), and her second studio album, Kicker (2015). It was released as the former record's second and final single on December 9, 2014 as a digital download through Pinetop and Hollywood Records. The song was written by Zella Day, Xandy Barry, Wally Gagel, and Bonnie Baker. Production was handled by Wax LTD.

References 

2014 singles
2014 songs
Hollywood Records singles
Songs written by Bonnie Baker (songwriter)
Songs written by Wally Gagel
Zella Day songs